Opel Automobile GmbH, usually shortened to Opel, is a German automobile manufacturer which has been a subsidiary of Stellantis since 16 January 2021. It was owned by the American automaker General Motors from 1929 until 2017 and the PSA Group, a predecessor of Stellantis, from 2017 until 2021. Some Opel vehicles were badge-engineered in Australia under the Holden brand until 2020 and in North America and China under the Buick, Saturn, and Cadillac brands.

Opel traces its roots to a sewing machine manufacturer founded by Adam Opel in 1862 in Rüsselsheim am Main. The company began manufacturing bicycles in 1886 and produced its first automobile in 1899. With the Opel RAK program, the world's first rocket program, under the leadership of Fritz von Opel, the company played an important role in the history of aviation and spaceflight: Various land speed records were achieved, and the world's first rocket-powered flights were performed in 1928 and 1929. After listing on the stock market in 1929, General Motors took a majority stake in Opel and then full control in 1931, making the automaker a wholly owned subsidiary, establishing an American ownership of the German automaker for nearly 90 years.

In March 2017, PSA agreed to acquire Opel, the British twin sister brand Vauxhall and the European auto lending business from General Motors for €2 billion ($2.3 billion), making the French automaker the second biggest in Europe, after Volkswagen.

Opel is still headquartered in Rüsselsheim am Main. The company designs, engineers, manufactures and distributes Opel-branded passenger vehicles, light commercial vehicles, and vehicle parts; together with its British sister marque Vauxhall, they are present in over 60 countries around the world.

History

1862–1898
The company was founded in Rüsselsheim, Hesse, Germany, on 21 January 1862, by Adam Opel. In the beginning, Opel produced sewing machines. Opel launched a new product in 1886: he began to sell high-wheel bicycles, also known as penny-farthings. Opel's two sons participated in high-wheel bicycle races, thus promoting this means of transportation.  In 1888, production was relocated from a cowshed to a more spacious building in Rüsselsheim. The production of high-wheel bicycles soon exceeded the production of sewing machines. At the time of Opel's death in 1895, he was the leader in both markets.

1898–1920
The first cars were designed in 1898 after Opel's widow Sophie and their two eldest sons entered into a partnership with Friedrich Lutzmann, a locksmith at the court in Dessau in Saxony-Anhalt, who had been working on automobile designs for some time. The first Opel production Patent Motor Car was built in Rüsselsheim early 1899, although these cars were not very successful (A total of 65 motor cars were delivered: [15] 11 in 1899, 24 copies in 1900 and 30 in 1901) and the partnership was dissolved after two years, following which Opel signed a licensing agreement in 1901 with the French Automobiles Darracq France to manufacture vehicles under the brand name Opel Darracq. These cars consisted of Opel bodies mounted on Darracq chassis, powered by two-cylinder engines.

The company first showed cars of its own design at the 1902 Hamburg Motor Show, and started manufacturing them in 1906, with Opel Darracq production being discontinued in 1907.

In 1909, the Opel 4/8 PS model, known as the Doktorwagen ("Doctor's Car") was produced. Its reliability and robustness were appreciated by physicians, who drove long distances to see their patients back when hard-surfaced roads were still rare. The Doktorwagen sold for only 3,950 marks, about half as much as the luxury models of its day.

In 1911, the company's factory was virtually destroyed by fire and a new one was built with more up-to-date machinery.

Opels cars were initially tested on public roads which then led to complaints about noise and damage to the roads.  Under public pressure, Opel began construction of a test oval in 1917. The track was completed in 1919 but not opened to the public until 24 October 1920 under the official name of Opel-Rennbahn, or Opel Race Track in English.

1920–1939

In the early 1920s, Opel became the first German car manufacturer to incorporate a mass-production assembly line in the building of their automobiles. In 1924, they used their assembly line to produce a new open two-seater called the Laubfrosch (Tree frog). The Laubfrosch was finished exclusively in green lacquer. The car sold for an expensive 3,900 marks (expensive considering the less expensive manufacturing process), but by the 1930s, this type of vehicle would cost a mere 1,930 marks – due in part to the assembly line, but also due to the skyrocketing demand for cars. Adam Opel led the way for motorised transportation to become not just a means for the rich, but also a reliable way for people of all classes to travel.

Opel had a 37.5% market share in Germany and was also the country's largest automobile exporter in 1928. The "Regent" – Opel's first eight-cylinder car – was offered. The RAK 1 and RAK 2 rocket-propelled cars made sensational record-breaking runs.

Opel as a company and its co-owner Fritz von Opel, grandson of Adam Opel, were instrumental in popularizing rockets as means of propulsion for vehicles and have an important place in the history of spaceflight and rocket technology. In the 1920s, Fritz von Opel initiated together with Max Valier, co-founder of the "Verein für Raumschiffahrt", the world's first rocket program, Opel-RAK, leading to speed records for automobiles, rail vehicles and the first manned rocket-powered flight in September 1929. After these successes, von Opel piloted the world's first public rocket-powered flight using Opel RAK.1, a rocket plane designed by Julius Hatry. World media reported these events, including Universal Newsreel in the US, causing "Raketen-Rummel" or "Rocket Rumble" immense global public excitement, particularly in Germany, where, among others, Wernher von Braun was highly influenced.

Opel RAK became enthralled with liquid propulsion, building and testing them in the late 1920s in Rüsselsheim. According to Max Valier's account, Opel RAK rocket designer, Friedrich Wilhelm Sander launched two liquid-fuel rockets at Opel Rennbahn in Rüsselsheim on 10 and 12 April 1929. These Opel RAK rockets have been the first European, and after Goddard the world's second, liquid-fuel rockets in history. The maximum thrust was 45 to 50 kp, with a total burning time of 132 seconds. These properties indicate a gas pressure pumping. The first missile rose so quickly that Sander lost sight of it. Two days later, a second unit was ready to go, Sander tied a -long rope to the rocket. After  of rope had been unwound, the line broke and this rocket also disappeared in the area, probably near the Opel proving ground and racetrack in Rüsselsheim, the "Rennbahn". Sander and Opel were also working for a novel liquid-propellant rocket engine for an anticipated flight across the English Channel. By May 1929, the engine produced a thrust of 200 kg (440 lb.) "for longer than fifteen minutes and in July 1929, the Opel RAK collaborators were able to attain powered phases of more than thirty minutes for thrusts of 300 kg (660-lb.) at Opel's works in Rüsselsheim," again according to Max Valier's account.

The Great Depression led to an end of the Opel-RAK program, but Max Valier continued the efforts. After switching from solid-fuel to liquid-fuel rockets, he died while testing and is considered the first fatality of the dawning space age. Sander's technology was confiscated by German military in 1935, he was forced to sell his company, and was imprisoned for alleged treason. He died in 1938.

In March 1929, General Motors (GM), impressed by Opel's modern production facilities, bought 80% of the company. The Opel family gained $33.3 million from the transaction. Subsequently, during 1935, a second factory was built at Brandenburg for the production of "Blitz" light trucks. In 1929 Opel licensed design of the radical Neander motorcycle, and produced it as the Opel Motoclub in 1929 and 1930, using Küchen, J.A.P., and Motosacoche engines. Fritz von Opel famously attached solid-fuel rockets to his Motoclub in a publicity stunt, riding the rocket-boosted motorcycle at the Avus racetrack.

In 1931 – after acquiring the rest of the shares – General Motors took over the full ownership of Adam Opel AG, making the company a wholly owned subsidiary, and later, in 1935, Opel became the first German car manufacturer to produce over 100,000 vehicles a year. This was based on the popular Opel P4 model.

Opel also produced the first mass-production vehicle in Germany with a self-supporting ("unibody") all-steel body, closely following the 1934 Citroën Traction Avant. This was one of the most important innovations in automotive history. They called the car, launched in 1935, the Olympia. With its small weight and aerodynamics came an improvement in both performance and fuel consumption. Opel received a patent on this technology. 

The 1930s was a decade of growth, and by 1937, with 130,267 cars produced, Opel's Rüsselsheim plant was Europe's top car plant in terms of output, while ranking seventh worldwide.

1938 saw the presentation of the highly successful Kapitän. With a 2.5 L six-cylinder engine, all-steel body, front independent suspension, hydraulic shock absorbers, hot-water heating (with electric blower), and central speedometer. 25,374 Kapitäns left the factory before the intensification of World War II brought automotive manufacturing to a temporary stop in the autumn of 1940, by order of the government.

World War II
Opel automobile production ended in October 1940, after the company's American leadership had rejected an "invitation" to switch to munitions manufacture a few months earlier. In 1942 Opel switched to wartime production, making aircraft parts and tanks. They kept manufacturing trucks at the Brandenburg plant, where the 3.6-liter Opel Blitz truck had been built since 1938. These  trucks were also built under license by Daimler-Benz in Mannheim.

1945–1970

After the end of the war, with the Brandenburg plant dismantled and transported to the Soviet Union, and 47% of the buildings in Rüsselsheim destroyed, former Opel employees began to rebuild the Rüsselsheim plant. The first postwar Opel Blitz truck was completed on 15 July 1946 in the presence of United States Army General Geoffrey Keyes and other local leaders and press reporters. Opel's Rüsselsheim plant also made Frigidaire refrigerators in the early post-war years.

1970–2017

During the 1970s and 1980s, the Vauxhall and Opel ranges were rationalised into one consistent range across Europe.

The 1973 version of the Opel Kadett was later rebadged in hatchback, saloon and estate form as the Vauxhall Chevette for the UK market, with German factories producing the opel versions. The Opel Ascona of this era was sold on the UK market (and produced in both British and continental factories) as the Vauxhall Cavalier. Both of these cars had mild styling changes, as did the flagship Opel Rekord and Vauxhall Carlton saloon and estate ranges which went on sale towards the end of the 1970s.

By the 1970s, Opel had emerged as the stronger of GM's two European brands; Vauxhall was the third-best selling brand in Great Britain after the British Motor Corporation (later British Leyland) but made only a modest impact elsewhere. The two companies were direct competitors outside of each other's respective home markets, but mirroring US automaker Ford's decision to merge its British and German subsidiaries in the late 1960s, GM followed the same precedent. Opel and Vauxhall had loosely collaborated before, but serious efforts to merge the two companies' operations and product families into one did not start until the 1970s – which had Vauxhall's complete product line replaced by vehicles built on Opel-based platforms – the only exception to the rule being the Bedford CF panel van, the only solely Vauxhall design which was marketed as an Opel on the Continent. By the turn of the 1980s, the two brands were in effect, one and the same.

Opel's first front-wheel drive car - the new version of the Kadett - entered production in 1979, initially built in Germany and Belgium. It was sold in the UK alongside the stronger selling Vauxhall version - the Astra - which also entered UK production in 1981.

During the 1970s, Opel expressed interest in building an additional production facility in Spain, and eventually settled on a location near Zaragoza, with the intention of building a new supermini for the 1980s there. The factory opened in 1982, and its first product was the Opel Corsa (imported to the UK as the Vauxhall Nova from 1983).

The Ascona switched to front-wheel drive for an all-new General Motors J-Car global model format in 1981, with the Cavalier nameplate continuing for the UK market. The Kadett was revamped again in 1984, and became the company's first winner of the European Car of the Year accolade. The Rekord's successor, the Opel Omega (still Vauxhall Carlton in the UK), achieved the same success two years later.

The long-running Ascona nameplate was discontinued in 1988, with its replacement being sold as the Vectra, although the UK market version was still sold as the Vauxhall Cavalier. The Opel Manta coupe was also discontinued in 1988, with its Vectra-based successor the Calibra being launched the following year. Soon afterwards, Opel launched a high performance version of the Omega - the Lotus Omega (Lotus Carlton in the UK) - which featured Lotus-tuned suspension and had a top speed of 175 mph.

Opel's first turbocharged car was the Opel Rekord 2.3 TD, first shown at Geneva in March 1984.

In the 1990s, Opel was considered to be GM's cash cow, with profit margins similar to that of Toyota. Opel's profit helped to offset GM's losses in North America and to fund GM's expansion into Asia. 1999 was the last time when Opel was profitable for the full year for almost 20 years.

The first major Opel launch of the 1990s was the 1991 Astra, which spelled the end for the Kadett nameplate that had debuted more than 50 years earlier. The company also turned to GM's Japanese division Isuzu for its first SUV, the Frontera, which was also launched in 1991 but produced in Europe despite its Japanese origins. The larger Monterey joined the company's SUV line-up in 1994, but had been dropped from the UK and continental markets by 2000 due to disappointing sales.

At the end of 1992, the company unveiled a completely new Corsa, which like the original model was produced at the Zaragoza plant, but this time carried the Corsa nameplate on the UK market as a Vauxhall.

A second generation Omega was launched in early 1994 and remained in production for a decade, but when production finished there was no direct successor due to declining sales of executive saloon models from mainstream brands. A Corsa-based coupe, the Tigra, was also launched around this time, and lasted in production for six years.

The second generation Opel Vectra was launched in 1995, with the Vectra nameplate now extending to the Vauxhall version in the UK.

The first Opel MPV, the Sintra, was launched in Europe in 1996, imported from the USA where it was sold as a Pontiac, but discontinued after three years due to disappointing sales. The Vauxhall-badged UK market version was also slated in motoring surveys for its dismal build quality and reliability.

1997 saw the demise of the Calibra coupe after an eight-year production, with no immediate replacement.

The Opel Astra hatchbacks, saloons and estate were completely revamped for 1998, and within two years had also spawned coupe and cabriolet versions, as well as a compact MPV, the Zafira.

In 1999, Opel unveiled its first sports car, the Speedster (Vauxhall VX220 in the UK). However, it was not a success, and was axed in 2005. The company moved into the city car market in early 2000 with the launch of the Agila.

The third generation Opel Corsa was launched in 2000, followed by a new version of the Vectra in 2002 and the Astra in 2004.

Three generations of Vectra gave way to the Insignia in 2008, with the new model becoming the company's first European Car of the Year award winner for 22 years.

Following the 2008 global financial crisis, and the Chapter 11 reorganization of GM, on 10 September 2009, GM agreed to sell a 55% stake in Opel to a consortium including Magna group and Sberbank - with the approval of the German government. The deal was later called off.

With ongoing restructuring plans, Opel announced the closure of its Antwerp plant in Belgium by the end of 2010.

In 2010, Opel announced that it would invest around €11 billion in the next five years. €1 billion of that was designated solely for the development of innovative and fuel-saving engines and transmissions.

On 29 February 2012, Opel announced the creation of a major alliance with PSA Peugeot Citroen resulting in GM taking a 7% share of PSA, becoming PSA's second-largest shareholder after the Peugeot family. The alliance was intended to enable $2 billion per year of cost savings through platform sharing, common purchasing, and other economies of scale. In December 2013, GM sold its 7% interest in PSA for £250 million, after plans of cost savings were not as successful. Opel was said to be among Europe's most aggressive discounters in mass-market. GM reported a 2016 loss of US$257 million from its European operations. It is reported that GM has lost about US$20 billion in Europe since 1999.

Opel's plant in Bochum closed in December 2014, after 52 years of activity, due to overcapacity.

Opel withdrew from China, where it had a network of 22 dealers, in early 2015 after General Motors decided to withdraw its Chevrolet brand from Europe starting in 2016.

2017–present 
In March 2017, the PSA Group agreed to buy Opel, its English twin sister brand Vauxhall and their European auto lending business from General Motors for 2.2 billion. In return, General Motors will pay PSA US$3.2 billion for future European pension obligations and keep managing US$9.8 billion worth of plans for existing retirees. Furthermore, GM is responsible for paying about US$400 million annually for 15 years to fund the existing Great Britain and Germany pension plans.

In June 2017, Michael Lohscheller, Opel's chief financial officer replaced Karl-Thomas Neumann as CEO. The acquisition of Opel and Vauxhall was completed in August 2017.

In the 2018 financial year, Opel achieved an operating income of €859 million. It was the first positive income since 1999.

On 16 January 2021, Opel was sold on to Stellantis following the merger of its Peugeot parent company PSA Group with Italian-American group Fiat Chrysler Automobiles.

In September 2021, Stellantis appoints Uwe Hochgeschurtz in Opel's management to replace Michael Lohscheller who left to Vinfast.

Company

Opel operates 10 vehicle, powertrain, and component plants and four development and test centres in six countries, and employs around 30,000 people in Europe. The brand sells vehicles in more than 60 markets worldwide. Other plants are in Eisenach and Kaiserslautern, Germany; Szentgotthárd, Hungary; Figueruelas, Spain; Gliwice, and Tychy, Poland; Aspern, Austria; Ellesmere Port, and Luton, United Kingdom. The Dudenhofen Test Center is located near the company's headquarters and is responsible for all technical testing and vehicle validations.

Around 6,250 people are responsible for the engineering and design of Opel/Vauxhall vehicles at the International Technical Development Center  and European Design Center in Rüsselsheim. All in all, Opel plays an important role in Stellantis' global R&D footprint.

Leadership

Plants

As of 2021 Opel Group GmbH is the contracted original equipment manufacturer (OEM) of Opel/Vauxhall. Adam Opel AG is the main supplier (tier 1) for the OEM, all subsidiaries are tier 2 suppliers.

Plant controlled as first-tier subsidiary of General Motors Europe Limited, second-tier subsidiary of GM CME Holdings CV and third-tier subsidiary of General Motors Corporation (GMC):

Marketing

Logo

The first Opel logo contained the letters "A" and "O" – the initials of the company's founder, Adam Opel. The A was in bronze, the O kept in red.

In 1866, Opel expanded and started to produce bicycles. Around 1890, the logo was completely redesigned. The new logo also contained the words "Victoria Blitz" (referring to Lady Victory; they were certain of the triumph of their bicycles). The word "Blitz" (English: lightning) first appeared back then, but without a depiction.

Another redesign was commissioned in 1909. The new logo was much more spirited and contained only the company name Opel. It was placed on the motorcycles that they had started to produce in 1902, and on the first cars which were produced in 1909.

In 1910, the logo was the shape of an eye, and it was surrounded by laurels, with the text "Opel" in the centre.

From the mid-1930s to the 1960s, passenger cars carried a ring which was crossed by some kind of a flying thing pointing to the left, which in some form could be interpreted as a zeppelin, the same flying object being used also as a forward-pointing hood ornament. In some versions, it looked like an arrow; in others, like an aeroplane or a bird.

Besides the hood ornament flying through the ring, Opel also used a coat of arms in various forms, which mostly had a combination of white and yellow colours in it, a shade of yellow which is typical for Opel until today. One was oval, half white and half yellow. The Opel writing was black and in the middle of the oval symbol.

The origin of the lightning in the Opel logo lies in the truck Opel Blitz (German Blitz = English "lightning"), which had been a commercial success, widely used also within the Wehrmacht, Nazi Germany's military. Originally, the logo for this truck consisted of two stripes arranged loosely like a lightning symbol with the words "Opel" and "Blitz" in them, in later, 1950s models simplified to the horizontal form of lightning which appears in the current Opel logo. The jag in the lightning always follows the original from the "Opel Blitz" text stripes, in the form of a horizontally stretched letter "Z".

By the end of the 1960s, the two forms merged, and the horizontal lightning replaced the flying thing in the ring, giving way to the basic design which is used since then with variations. Through all its variations, this logo is simple and unique, and both easily recognisable and reproducible with just two strokes of a pen.

In the 1964 version, the lightning with a ring was used in a yellow rectangle, with the Opel writing below.  The whole logo was again delimited by a black rectangle.  The basic form and proportions of the Blitz logo have remained unchanged since the 1970 version, which made the lightning tails shorter so that the logo could fit proportionately within a yellow square, meaning it could be displayed next to the 'blue square' General Motors logo.  In the mid-1970s, the Vauxhall "Griffin" logo was, in turn, resized and displayed within a corresponding red square, so that all three logos could be displayed together, thus signifying the unified GM Europe.

Clubs
The SC Opel Rüsselsheim is a football club with over 450 members. RV 1888 Opel Rüsselsheim is a cycling club.

Slogans
Opel's corporate tagline as of June 2017 is The Future Is Everyone's (German: Die Zukunft gehört allen). The list of Opel's slogans is shown below:
Fresh thinking – better cars. (2002–2007) 
Discover Opel (2007–2009) 
 (2009–2017)
The Future is Everyone's (2017–present)

Partnerships
Opel currently has partnerships with association football clubs such as Bundesliga clubs Borussia Dortmund and 1. FSV Mainz 05.
Opel cooperates with French oil&gas company TotalEnergies on plans for a battery cell factory. From 1994 until 2006, Opel has been partnership with Milan and previously with Fiorentina from 1983 until 1986 in Italy, from 1995 until 2002 with Paris Saint-Germain in France, from 1989 until 2002 with Bayern Munchen in Germany and from 2013 until 2017 with Feyenoord Rotterdam in Netherlands.

World presence

The Opel brand is present in most of Europe, in parts of North Africa, in South Africa, the Middle East (EMEA), in Chile and in Singapore. Their models have been rebadged and sold in other countries and continents, such as Vauxhall in Great Britain, Chevrolet in Latin America, Holden in Australia and New Zealand, and previously, Saturn in the United States and Canada. Following the demise of General Motors Corporation's Saturn division in North America, Opel cars are currently rebadged and sold in the United States, Canada, Mexico, and China under the Buick name with models such as the Opel Insignia/Buick Regal, Opel Astra sedan/Buick Verano (both which share underpinnings with the Chevrolet Cruze), and Opel Mokka/Buick Encore.

In 2017, GM confirmed plans of a "hybrid global brand" which includes Vauxhall, Opel and Buick to use more synergies between the brands. This plan was overridden by the sale of Vauxhall and Opel brands to PSA Peugeot Citroën.

North America

United States
Opel cars appeared under their own name in the US from 1958 to 1975, when they were sold through Buick dealers as captive imports. The best-selling Opel models in the US were the 1964 to 1972 Opel Kadett, the 1971 to 1975 Opel Manta, and the 1968 to 1973 Opel GT. (The name "Opel" was also applied from 1976 to 1980 to vehicles manufactured by Isuzu (similar to the "Isuzu I-Mark"), but mechanically those were entirely different cars).

Historically, Opel vehicles have also been sold at various times in the North American market as either heavily modified, or "badge-engineered" models under the Chevrolet, Buick, Pontiac, Saturn, and Cadillac brands – for instance the J-body platform, which was largely developed by Opel – was the basis of North American models such as the Chevrolet Cavalier and Cadillac Cimarron.  Below is a list of current or recent Opel models which are sold under GM's North American brands.

Buick Regal (fifth generation, 2009–2017, and sixth generation, 2018–2020) 
The last two generations of the Buick Regal have been rebadged versions of the Opel Insignia. The main differences are the modified radiator grill and the altered colour of the passenger compartment illumination (blue instead of red). The Regal GS is comparable to the Insignia OPC. The 5th generation Buick Regal was first assembled alongside the Insignia at the Opel plant in Rüsselsheim. In the first quarter of 2011, it began to be built on the flexible assembly line at the GM plant in Oshawa, Ontario, Canada. All 6th generation Buick Regals were built alongside the Insignia at the Opel plant in Rüsselsheim, Germany.

Buick Cascada 
The Buick Cascada is a rebadged Opel Cascada, built in Poland and sold in the United States unchanged from the Opel in all but badging.

Buick LaCrosse 
Unlike the vehicles listed above, the Buick LaCrosse is not a rebadged version of an Opel model. However, it is based on a long-wheelbase version of the Opel-developed Epsilon II-platform, so shares many key components with the Opel Insignia and thereby the Buick Regal.

Saturn Astra (2008–2009) 
The Astra H was sold in the US as the Saturn Astra for model years 2008 and 2009.

Saturn L-Series (2000–2005) 
The Saturn L-Series was a modified version of the Opel Vectra B. Though the Saturn had different exterior styling and had plastic door panels, it shared the same body shape as the Opel. Both cars rode on the GM2900 platform. The Saturn also had a different interior, yet shared some interior parts, such as the inside of the doors.

Saturn VUE (2nd generation, 2008–2010), Chevrolet Captiva Sport 
The second generation of the Saturn VUE, introduced in 2007 for the 2008 model year, was a rebadged version of the German-designed Opel Antara, manufactured in Mexico. After the demise of the Saturn brand, the VUE was discontinued, but the car continued to be produced and sold as Chevrolet Captiva Sport in Mexican and South American markets. The Chevrolet Captiva Sport was introduced for the US commercial and fleet markets in late 2011 for the 2012 model.

Cadillac Catera (1997–2001) 
The Opel Omega B was sold in the US as the Cadillac Catera.

Africa 
Opel exports a variety of models to Algeria, Egypt, Morocco, and South Africa.

South Africa 

The 2015 Opel range in South Africa comprises the Opel Adam, Opel Astra, Opel Corsa, Opel Meriva, Opel Mokka, and Opel Vivaro. No diesel versions are offered.

From 1986 to 2003, Opel models were produced by Delta Motor Corporation, a company created through a management buyout following of GM's divestment from apartheid South Africa. Delta assembled the Opel Kadett, with the sedan version called the Opel Monza. This was replaced by the Opel Astra, although the Kadett name was retained for the hatchback and considered a separate model. A version of the Rekord Series E remained in production after the model had been replaced by the Omega in Europe, as was a Commodore model unique to South Africa, combining the bodyshell of the Rekord with the front end of the revised Senator. The Opel Corsa was introduced in 1996, with kits of the Brazilian-designed sedan and pick-up (known in South African English as a bakkie) being locally assembled.

Although GM's passenger vehicle line-up in South Africa consisted of Opel-based models by the late 1970s, these were sold under the Chevrolet brand name, with only the Kadett being marketed as an Opel when it was released in 1980. In 1982, the Chevrolet brand name was dropped, with the Ascona, Rekord, Commodore, and Senator being rebadged as Opels.

Oceania
Many Opel models or models based on Opel architectures have been sold in Australia and New Zealand under the Holden marque, such as the Holden Barina (1994–2005), which were rebadged versions of the Opel Corsa, the Holden Astra, a version of the Opel Astra, and the Captiva 5, a version of the Opel Antara. In New Zealand, the Opel Kadett and Ascona were sold as niche models by General Motors New Zealand in the 1980s, while the Opel brand was used on the Opel Vectra until 1994.

For the first time ever, the Opel brand was introduced to Australia on 1 September 2012, including the Corsa, Astra, Astra GTC, and Insignia models. On 2 August 2013, Opel announced it was ending exports to Australia due to poor sales, with only 1,530 vehicles sold in the first ten months.

After the closure of Opel Australia, Holden imports newer Opel models such as the Astra GTC (ceased 1 May 2017), Astra VXR (Astra OPC), Cascada (ceased 1 May 2017), and Insignia VXR (Insignia OPC, ceased 1 May 2017), under the Holden badge. The 2018 5th-gen Holden Commodore ZB is a badge-engineered Opel Insignia, replacing the Australian-made, rear-wheel-drive Commodore with the German-made front-wheel/all-wheel-drive Insignia platform; however this model is no longer offered since the closure of Holden.

Opel returned to the New Zealand market in 2022, backed by the existing importer of the Peugeot and Citroën brands.

Asia

China
Opel's presence in China recommenced in 2012 with the Antara, and added the Insignia estate in 2013. Opel-derived models are also sold as Buick. On 28 March 2014, Opel announced that it would leave China in 2015.

Japan

Opel was long General Motors' strongest marque in Japan, with sales peaking at 38,000 in 1996. However, the brand was withdrawn from the Japanese market in December 2006, with just 1,800 sales there in 2005. Since then, Opel has not sold any cars or SUVs in Japan. Opel is plan to returning to the Japanese market in 2022.

Singapore
A wide range of Opel models are exported to Singapore.

Malaysia
Opel was marketed in Malaysia beginning from the 1970s, and early models exported were Kadett, Gemini, and Manta. Opel had moderate sales from the 1980s until the early 2000s, when Malaysian car buyers favoured Japanese and Korean brand cars such as Toyota, Honda, Hyundai (Inokom) and Kia (Naza), which offered more competitive prices. Sales of Opel cars in Malaysia were dropped then, as Opel's prices were slightly higher than the same-segment Japanese, Korean, and local Proton and Perodua cars, and they were hard to maintain, had bad aftersales services, and spare parts were not readily available.

Opel was withdrawn from Malaysian market in 2003, and the last models sold were the Zafira, Astra, and Vectra, and the rebadged Isuzu MU as the Frontera, later replaced by Chevrolet.

India 
Opel India Pvt Ltd (OIPL) was founded in 1996 and gave the average Indian car buyers their first choice of (somewhat) affordable German engineering with the Astra sedan. Opel was withdrawn from the Indian market in 2006, replaced by Chevrolet.

Indonesia 
Since 1938, the country has been producing Opels in a General Motors-owned plant since 1938. The plant was nationalized in 1957. In 1995, General Motors invested a new manufacturing plant in Indonesia, producing the Opel Astra (as Opel Optima), Opel Vectra, and Chevrolet Blazer (as Opel Blazer). The latter was proved a sales success in the country. In 2002, the Opel brand was replaced by the global Chevrolet brand.

Thailand
Since the 1970s Opel cars were imported with Holden cars by Universal Motors Thailand and Asoke Motors. They imported the Opel Rekord, Holden Torana, and the Opel Olympia.
In the middle of the era the next importer is Phranakorn Yontrakarn (PNA) which starting importing cars to Thailand in the mid-1980s. PNA imported the Kadett, Astra, Vectra, Omega, and the Calibra to Thailand. On the last era of Opel in Thailand was managed by General Motors Thailand they're planned to build assembly plant in Rayong. They planned to manufacture the Zafira in Thailand, the Zafira has shown at BOI Fair in 1998–1999 in Thailand and from the Asian financial crisis on that time they withdrawn from Thailand in 2000 and replaced by Chevrolet.

Philippines
Opel was one of the most popular non-Japanese car brands in the country during the 1970s and the 1980s alongside Ford, but left the Filipino market in 1985 as a result of the economic crisis at that time. GM Philippines returned with the Opel brand in 1997, and started selling the Vectra, Omega and later the Tigra and Astra. Sales were good years after its introduction but Opel still struggled as Japanese manufacturers dominated the local automobile market. GM Philippines withdrew the brand by 2004–2005 due to poor sales. The last cars sold by Opel in the country before leaving the Philippine market were the Astra and the Zafira A (Which was being sold under the Chevrolet brand). The Opel brand was later replaced by Chevrolet's lineup.

Taiwan
In the 1980s, Kadett E and Omega A were imported to the Taiwanese market but the dealers imported base models and modified them with unstable quality. The CAC company became the sole import agent of Opel in Taiwan and the models were later manufacturing and sold the Astra F and Vectra B in the market. However, CAC went bankrupt in the late 1990s and stopped manufacturing Opel cars. GM Taiwan and then Yulon GM, a joint venture between Yulong and General Motors, kept importing and selling Astra G/H, Corsa B/C, Omega B, and Zafira A/B in Taiwan until 2012. In 2022, Master Win Group announce to relaunch Opel in Taiwan market.

South America
Several Opel models were sold across Latin America, mainly Brazil and Argentina, for decades with Chevrolet development badges and its derivatives, including the Corsa, Kadett, Astra, Vectra, Omega, Meriva, and Zafira. In the early 2010s, the Chevrolet line-up changed to adopt North American models such as the Spark, Sonic, and Cruze, or local own Brazilian development models like the Cobalt, Celta, Onix, Spin and Agile, which only Onix is still produced.

Opel has exported a wide range of products to Chile since 2011 and Colombia, Ecuador, Uruguay since 2021.

Europe

Great Britain

Ireland
In the 1980s, Opel became the sole GM brand name in Ireland, with the Vauxhall brand having been dropped. Vauxhall's Managing Director has also been Opel Ireland's Chief Executive since 2015.

There were two Opel-franchised assembly plants in Ireland in the 1960s. One in Ringsend, Dublin, was operated by Reg Armstrong Motors, which also assembled NSU cars and motorcycles. The second assembly plant was based in Cork and operated by O'Shea's, which also assembled Škoda cars and Zetor tractors. The models assembled were the Kadett and the Rekord. From 1966, the Admiral was imported as a fully built unit and became a popular seller.

European Car of the Year
Opel have produced five winners of the European Car of the Year competition:
 1985: Opel Kadett E
 1987: Opel Omega A
 2009: Opel Insignia
 2012: Opel Ampera
 2016: Opel Astra K

Shortlisted models
Several models have been shortlisted, including the:
 1980: Opel Kadett D
 1981: Opel Ascona C
 1989: Opel Vectra A
 1991: Opel Calibra
 1992: Opel Astra F
 1995: Opel Omega B
 1999: Opel Astra G
 2000: Opel Zafira A
 2007: Opel Corsa D
 2010: Opel Astra J
 2011: Opel Meriva B

Nomenclature
From the late 1930s to the 1980s, terms from the German Navy (Kapitän, Admiral, Kadett) and from other official sectors (Diplomat, Senator) were often used as model names. Since the late 1980s, the model names of Opel passenger cars end with an a. As Opels were no longer being sold in Great Britain, the need to have separate model names for essentially identical Vauxhall and Opel cars (although some exceptions were made to suit the British market) was made redundant. The last series to be renamed across the two companies was the Opel Kadett, being the only Opel to take the name of its Vauxhall counterpart, as Opel Astra. Although only two generations of Astra were built prior to the 1991 model, the new car was referred to across Europe as the Astra F, referring to its Kadett lineage. Until 1993, the Opel Corsa was known as the Vauxhall Nova in Great Britain, as Vauxhall had initially felt that Corsa sounded too much like "coarse", and would not catch on.

Exceptions to the nomenclature of ending names with an "a" include the under-licence built Monterey, the Speedster (also known as the Vauxhall VX220 in Great Britain), GT (which was not sold at all as a Vauxhall, despite the VX Lightning concept), the Signum, Karl, and the Adam. The Adam was initially supposed to be called, "Junior" as was its developmental codename and because the name 'Adam' had no history/importance to the Vauxhall marque.

Similar to the passenger cars, the model names of commercial vehicles end with an o (Combo, Vivaro, Movano), except the Corsavan and Astravan for obvious reasons.

Another unique aspect to Opel nomenclature is its use of the "Caravan" (originally styled as 'Car-A-Van') name to denote its station wagon body configuration, (similar to Volkswagen's Variant or Audi's Avant designations), a practice the company observed for many decades, which finally ceased with the 2008 Insignia and 2009 Astra, where the name "Sports Tourer" is now used for the estate/station wagon versions.

Current model range

The following tables list current and announced Opel production vehicles as of 2022:

Light commercial vehicles

Discontinued models

Introduced before acquisition by General Motors (1899–1929)

Introduced after acquisition by General Motors (1929–2017)

Motorsports

Opel Rally Team took part in World Rally Championship in the early 1980s with the Opel Ascona 400 and the Opel Manta 400, developed in conjunction with Irmscher and Cosworth. Walter Röhrl won the 1982 World Rally Championship drivers' title, and the 1983 Safari Rally was won by Ari Vatanen.

In the 1990s, Opel took part in the Deutsche Tourenwagen Meisterschaft and the succeeding International Touring Car Championship, and won the 1996 championship with the Calibra. Opel took part in the revived German DTM race series between 2000 and 2005 with the Astra and Vectra models, but after winning several races in 2000, it struggled for results afterwards and never won the championship. However, Opel won the Nürburgring 24 Hours with the Astra in 2003.

Opel returned to motorsport competition with the Adam in 2013.

In 2014, Opel presented a road-legal sport version of the Adam R2 Rally Car – the Opel Adam S – powered by a 1.4 L turbocharged engine which generates 150 HP. The car makes 0–100 km/h in just 8.5 seconds.

See also
 Fritz von Opel
 Rikky von Opel
 Wilhelm von Opel
 Irmscher
 Steinmetz Opel Tuning
 IDA-Opel
 List of German cars

References

External links
 
 
 
 Technical specifications of Opel models
 
 

 
Companies that filed for Chapter 11 bankruptcy in 2009
Car manufacturers of Germany
Vehicle manufacturing companies established in 1862
Companies based in Hesse
German brands
Luxury motor vehicle manufacturers
Stellantis
Truck manufacturers of Germany
Motorcycle manufacturers of Germany
Cycle manufacturers of Germany
1862 establishments in Germany
Car brands
2017 mergers and acquisitions
German subsidiaries of foreign companies
Former General Motors subsidiaries